Mansfield Independents, previously known as Mansfield Independent Forum, is a local political party in the local government district of Mansfield in Nottinghamshire, England. It was officially registered in 2005, having already successfully campaigned for the election of Tony Egginton as Mayor of Mansfield two years earlier. Egginton had stood for election after being convinced to do so by the leader of the pro-Mayoralty campaign, Stewart Rickersey.

History

The directly elected Mayor of Mansfield was created following moves made by Mansfield-based businessman Stuart Rickersey to change the governance of Mansfield through a public referendum. Local newsagent Tony Egginton was encouraged to stand as an independent candidate in the ensuing election, and was elected to the position on 17 October 2002.

Following Egginton's successful election as Mayor, Rickersey then recruited many ward councillor-candidates to challenge Labour's traditional domination at the May 2003 local elections, winning control of the council with 25 seats. Most of the newly elected councillors were new and inexperienced. Egginton formed his Cabinet mostly of MIF members including Rickersey as Portfolio Holder for Corporate Issues. The party was officially registered with the electoral commission on 14 July 2005, formalising the existence of a party that had unofficially existed since Egginton's election. Fellow Mansfield Independent Kate Allsop was elected as Executive Mayor to succeed Egginton following his retirement in 2015.

In September 2019 the party was renamed to the Mansfield Independents.

Election results

The Mansfield Independent Forum has contested elections since Tony Egginton's election in 2002, first informally as an alliance of independent councillors in 2003 and then formally as a registered UK political party from 2005 onwards.

Mayoral elections 

Tony Egginton served as Mayor of Mansfield from 2002 until his retirement in 2015. He was succeeded by Kate Allsop, also of the Mansfield Independents.

District Council elections 

Mansfield Independent Forum councillors held a majority on Mansfield District Council from 2003–2011. The party lost control of the council to the Labour Party in 2011 before regaining control in 2015.

County Council elections 

Mansfield Independent Forum has been represented on Nottinghamshire County Council since 2009. Following the 2017 election the party became the junior partner in a governing coalition with the Conservatives.

UK Parliament elections 

The party fielded a candidate in the 2005 election, coming third behind Labour and the Conservatives. In the 2010 general election they were reduced to fourth place behind the Liberal Democrats. The party did not field official candidates in the 2015, 2017 or 2019 elections.

See also
Mayor of Mansfield
Nottinghamshire local elections
2015 Mansfield District Council election

References

Locally based political parties in England